Dixus is a genus of beetles in the family Carabidae, containing the following species:

 Dixus capito (Audinet-Servile, 1821)
 Dixus dypeatus P. Rossi, 1790
 Dixus eremita Dejean, 1825
 Dixus infans (Abeille, 1909)
 Dixus interruptus (Fabricius, 1775)
 Dixus klapperchi (Jedlicka, 1964)
 Dixus moloch (Piochard de la Brulerie, 1873)
 Dixus obsurus Dejean, 1825

References

Harpalinae
Beetles described in 1820